Olivella nivea, the snowy dwarf olive, is a species of small sea snail, marine gastropod mollusk in the subfamily Olivellinae, in the family Olividae, the olives.  Species in the genus Olivella are commonly called dwarf olives.

Description
The shell has an acutely pointed tip; entirely white, or marked by two bands of angulated purplish spots.

References

 http://www.marinespecies.org/aphia.php?p=taxdetails&id=420113

nivea
Gastropods described in 1791